The MG-111 is a state highway located in the Brazilian state of Minas Gerais. Its route starts in Ipanema and ends at the border between the states of Minas Gerais and Rio de Janeiro.

Route
MG-111 passes through the following municipalities:
 Ipanema
 Conceição de Ipanema
 Santana do Manhuaçu
 Manhuaçu
 Reduto
 Manhumirim
 Alto Jequitibá
 Caparaó
 Espera Feliz
 Carangola
 Faria Lemos
 Tombos

References 

Highways in Minas Gerais